The Canadian Folk Music Award for Ensemble of the Year is a Canadian award, presented as part of the Canadian Folk Music Awards to honour the year's best work by duos and bands in Canadian folk music and related genres. Albums officially credited to solo artists can be nominated for the award, in consideration of the collective work by all musicians participating in the recording.

2000s

2010s

2020s

References

Ensemble